Yummy: the Last Days of a Southside Shorty is a graphic novel by Greg Neri with art by Randy DuBurke, published by Lee and Low Books in August 2010. The story is about Robert “Yummy” Sandifer, who was eleven years old in 1994 when he became a fugitive from justice after killing a neighbor girl while he was shooting at somebody else during a gang initiation. Neri creates a fictional narrator who watches what happens to Yummy when he seeks help from the gang he is trying to impress. Instead, they turn on him when he becomes too much of a liability to them.

Critical reception
Kirkus Reviews described the book by saying, "A haunting, ripped-from-the-headlines account of youth gang violence in Chicago provides the backdrop for a crucial meditation on right and wrong." On Goodreads, Yummy has an average of 3.98 out of 5 stars.

Awards
The book won a 2011 Coretta Scott King Author Honor Award and was named one of the Best Books of 2010 by Publishers Weekly, Booklist, and Kirkus Reviews. It also has received five starred reviews—from Kirkus Reviews, Booklist, School Library Journal, the Bulletin of the Center of Children's Books, and VOYA.

 Publishers Weekly Best Books of 2010
 2011 YALSA Top 10 Quick Picks
 2011 IRA Notable Book for a Global Society
 Chicago Public Library - Best Informational Books for Older Readers of 2010
 Cynsational Books of 2010
 2011 Glyph Award nomination - Story of the Year
 2011 Simon Wiesenthal Center Museum of Tolerance Once Upon A World Children's Book Award

References

External links
 G. Neri talks about Yummy on NPR
 Video trailer for Yummy
 Author website
 Lee and Low website
 "Murder in Miniature," the original Time Magazine article on Yummy's life and death
 G. Neri on Beginning the Journey to a Finished Novel

2010 graphic novels
American children's novels
Biographical comics
Fiction set in 1994
2010 children's books